The Arahura River, for a time called the Brunner River after the explorer Thomas Brunner, is a river located on the West Coast of the South Island of New Zealand. In 1846 Brunner and Heaphy sketched and described a Māori settlement they called Araura  (Arahura).

It is an important place to Māori for the resource of pounamu (greenstone), only found in a few places in the South Island of New Zealand. When the region was sold to the British Crown in 1860 by the chiefs of Poutini Ngāi Tahu the rights to pounamu on the Arahura River were meant to be retained, these rights were ignored in the deed (Arahura Deed) . In 1990s Ngāi Tahu and the government negotiated for ownership of pounamu from the river to be restored and this was settled in the Ngai Tahu (Pounamu Vesting) Act 1997. 

The lower reaches of the Arahura River were a major producer of gold in the past – and extensively mined, but are now worked out. 

In 2009 the 120-year-old dual road/rail bridge across the river was replaced. Sections of the old bridge were reused elsewhere on the rail network and one complete span was retained for a local heritage park.

The river is the subject of a 2016 song of the same name by Marlon Williams.

References

External links
An Encyclopaedia of New Zealand, edited by A. H. McLintock, originally published in 1966.

Westland District
Rivers of the West Coast, New Zealand
Rivers of New Zealand
Bridges in the West Coast region